Solntsevo is the name of several inhabited localities in Russia.

Urban localities
Solntsevo, Kursk Oblast, a work settlement in Solntsevsky District of Kursk Oblast

Rural localities
Solntsevo, Belgorod Oblast, a selo in Gubkinsky District of Belgorod Oblast
Solntsevo, Chaplyginsky District, Lipetsk Oblast, a selo in Solovskoy Selsoviet of Chaplyginsky District of Lipetsk Oblast
Solntsevo, Krasninsky District, Lipetsk Oblast, a village in Sotnikovsky Selsoviet of Krasninsky District of Lipetsk Oblast
Solntsevo, Omsk Oblast, a village in Krasnoyarsky Rural Okrug of Sherbakulsky District of Omsk Oblast
Solntsevo, Orlovsky District, Oryol Oblast, a selo in Obraztsovsky Selsoviet of Orlovsky District of Oryol Oblast
Solntsevo, Uritsky District, Oryol Oblast, a village in Podzavalovsky Selsoviet of Uritsky District of Oryol Oblast
Solntsevo, Zabaykalsky Krai, a selo in Shilkinsky District of Zabaykalsky Krai

Historical entities
Abolished inhabited localities
Solntsevo, a former town in Leninsky District of Moscow Oblast; since 1984—a part of the city of Moscow.